Witness of Truth: The Railway Murders is a British television docudrama, first broadcast on 11 December 2001, that dramatises the crimes committed by John Duffy and David Mulcahy, commonly known as the Railway Rapists or Railway Killers. The film, produced and directed by Bren Simson, is narrated by Lindsay Duncan, who provides additional details of the crimes, some of which are not dramatised in the film. Huw Higginson and Nicholas Marchie were cast as Mulcahy and Duffy respectively, with Steve Chaplin and Tat Whalley portraying teenage versions of the pair.

Adelene Alani acted as executive producer. Other notable cast members include Mark Spalding, who co-starred alongside Higginson in The Bill in 1995, Caroline Woodruff, Joanna Monro and Robert Swann. The film broadcast at 22:35; subsequently no viewing figures for the programme were recorded by BARB. The film has never been repeated and remains unreleased on VHS and DVD.

Cast
 Huw Higginson as David Mulcahy
 Nicholas Marchie as John Duffy
 Steve Chaplin as Young David Mulcahy 
 Tat Whalley as Young John Duffy
 Mark Spalding as Det. Supt. Andy Murphy
 Nick Burnell as Det. Insp. Mark Freeman
 Caroline Woodruf as Det. Con. Caroline Murphy
 Joanna Monro as Jenny Cutler
 Stephen Gurney as Det. Con. Larry Larmour
 Robert Swann as Det. Supt. Les Bolland
 Sarah Farooqui as Alison Day
 Claire Kent as Maartje Tamboezer
 Leah Fletcher	as Ann Lock
 Joanna Kirkland as Stella Arnold
 Jayne Dobson as Tina Clark
 Emma O'Donoghue as Pamela Taylor

References

External links

2001 television films
2001 films
British crime drama films
BBC television docudramas
BBC Film films
Films shot in London
2000s English-language films
2000s British films
British drama television films